The current devised Emblem of the Macao Special Administrative Region of the People's Republic of China came into use on 20 December 1999, when the sovereignty of Macau (Macao) was transferred from Portugal to the People's Republic of China. The emblem is now referred to officially as the "Regional Emblem".

Description 
The regional emblem features the same design elements as the regional flag of Macau in a circular setting. The outer white ring is shown with the caption of the official name of the territory in traditional Chinese characters (as opposed to the simplified form): "" (Macao Special Administrative Region of the People's Republic of China) and the Portuguese short form, "Macau".

History 
The coat of arms used by Portugal followed traditional European styles:

The first coat of arms used in Macau was used until the end of the 19th century. It features the arms of Portugal surrounded by the saying Cidade do nome de Deus, não há outra mais Leal (Portuguese for "City of the Name of God, there is none more Loyal").

In 1935, most Portuguese colonies were given coats of arms that followed a standard design pattern. For Macau, a dragon was used for the part of the shield featuring a design unique to each colony.

The last coat of arms of colonial Macau, used until 1999, shown here in its most simple form, was used in banknotes, coins, stamps, official documents and appears also in the facade of the "Banco Nacional Ultramarino" in Lisbon.

See also 
Flag of Macau
Emblem of Hong Kong

References

External links
 Lei n.º 6/1999 Utilização e Protecção da Bandeira e do Emblema Regionais
 Regulamento Administrativo n.º 5/2019 Disposições concretas relativas à utilização das Bandeiras e Emblemas Nacionais e Regionais e à execução instrumental e vocal do Hino Nacional
 Designs of the colonial coat of arms of Macao in 1934 Reference code(s): MO/AH/AC/SA/01/14775 - Webpage from the Archives of Macau website about several proposed coats of arms for Macau in 1934; none of which were adopted.

National symbols of the People's Republic of China
Coat of Arms
Macau
Macau
Macau
Chinese heraldry